The George Griswold House is located in Columbus, Wisconsin, United States. It was added to the National Register of Historic Places in 2009. Additionally, it is listed on the Wisconsin State Register of Historic Places.

History
The house was constructed from 1857 to 1858. It was owned by George Griswold, a store owner suffering from deteriorating eyesight who moved to Columbus from New York City. The floor plan of the house was designed after the house he grew up in as a child, thought to be at least partially so he was already familiar with the layout after his sight would begin to deteriorate further. Currently, the building is used as a funeral home.

References

Houses in Columbia County, Wisconsin
Houses completed in 1858
Houses on the National Register of Historic Places in Wisconsin
Italianate architecture in Wisconsin
Columbus, Wisconsin
National Register of Historic Places in Columbia County, Wisconsin